Fresh Fields is a British sitcom starring Julia McKenzie and Anton Rodgers. A ratings success at the time, it was written by John Chapman and produced by Thames Television for ITV, running for four series between 7 March 1984 and 23 October 1986.

Premise and series history
Hester and William Fields (McKenzie and Rodgers) are a devoted middle-aged, middle-class couple living an idyllic suburban lifestyle in Barnes, London. William works as an accountant while Hester is a housewife who works part-time in local restaurant Lucy's Kitchen. The title's meaning, and crux of the show, is that Hester combats empty-nest syndrome by livening up her life with new interests and hobbies, to the exasperation of her hard-working husband who just wants a quiet life. The show's opening credits, featuring silhouettes of the characters, reflect this: Hester rides an exercise bike and plays a drumkit while William relaxes in a rocking chair.

The family home has an attached granny flat in which Hester's mother Nancy (Fanny Rowe) lives following her divorce from Hester's roguish father Guy (Ballard Berkeley); he often tries to win her back. (The pair finally remarry in the last episode.) Hester and William have two children of their own: the never-seen Tom who lives in New Zealand; and Emma, who is usually only heard (voice of Debby Cummings) telephoning her parents at inconvenient times. Emma's husband Peter (Philip Bird) appears occasionally; Emma and Peter later present the Fields with their first grandchild Guy, named after his great-grandfather.

The Fields's neighbour Sonia Barrett (played by Ann Beach) pops round in every episode to borrow items; these appearances would irritate William to comical effect. Sonia had the show's only catchphrase: "It's only Sonia!" she carols as she raps at the Fields's back door then lets herself in. Sonia's husband John (John Arthur) appears occasionally, as does William's secretary Miss Marigold Denham (Daphne Oxenford).

Fresh Fields ended in 1986 but three years later the series resumed as French Fields, which saw William and Hester relocating to France after William accepted a job there. There were three series of 19 episodes made between 5 September 1989 and 8 October 1991, all written by John T. Chapman and Ian Davidson. Philip Bird appears as Peter in several episodes, with Emma finally seen on-screen, now played by Sally Baxter. Ann Beach makes a guest appearance as Sonia in the final episode.

Filming locations
The show's main filming location was the Fields's salubrious Victorian detached home, which is actually situated in Teddington on the A313, Hampton Road, a short drive from what was Thames TV's main studio complex, where the indoor scenes were shot.

Cast and characters

Episodes

Series overview

Series 1 (1984)

Series 2 (1984)

Series 3 (1985)

Christmas special (1985)

Series 4 (1986)

Home releases
All four series of Fresh Fields have been released on DVD, A 7-disc set (containing both the series and sequel title) was released in 2011.

References

External links

1984 British television series debuts
1986 British television series endings
1980s British sitcoms
Barnes, London
English-language television shows
ITV sitcoms
Television shows produced by Thames Television
Television series about families
Television series about marriage
Television series by Fremantle (company)
Television shows set in London
Television shows shot at Teddington Studios